Webbs may refer to:
 Webbs, Kentucky
 Stuart Webbs, a fictional detective in a series of German films and serials
 Sidney Webb, 1st Baron Passfield (1859–1947) and his wife Beatrice Webb (1858–1943), English socialists and social scientists
 Edward Webb and Sons, also known as Webbs, English seed merchants

See also
 Web (disambiguation)
 Webb (disambiguation)